Jimmy Star (born October 15, 1964) is an American radio/television host, actor, writer, clothing designer, and publicist.

Early life 
He was born in Miami, Florida.

Career

The Jimmy Star Show with Ron Russell 
Star is the host of The Jimmy Star Show with Ron Russell, which he shares with his husband Ron Russell. Ron is an actor, host, the producer, and Golden Age Hollywood expert. 

As part of the show, Russell interviewed celebrities such as Tony Curtis, Tippi Hedren, Tab Hunter, Dean Cain and Pink.

Publicist and public relations expert 
Jimmy Star is president of World Star PR.

Author 
Jimmy Star is an author. He wrote Charlie Chaplin: Silent Icon and wrote a chapter entitled "Secrets of Social Media Success" in The Change 16: Insights Into Self-empowerment.

Actor 
Jimmy Star appeared in several Marvel Cinematic Universe films. He appeared in 2010 in The Incubus, and in 2011 in Son of Morning.

He has appeared in eight different billion dollar movies (second only to Samuel L. Jackson), including Star Wars, Tenet, Captain America and Iron Man.

Clothing designer 
Since 1998, Jimmy Star has been an accomplished celebrity clothing and fashion designer.

Personal life 
Jimmy Star is married to actor, host, writer, and producer Ron Russell.

References

External links
 Jimmy Star on IMDB
 Stars and Celebs Dr JImmy Star
 Jimmy Stars World
 CenterStageMag Jimmy Star 

1964 births
Living people
American fashion designers
American male actors
American male writers
American publicists
American radio DJs
American television hosts
People from Miami